Jean Georges Lefranc de Pompignan (22 February 1715 in Montauban – 29 December 1790 in Paris) was a French clergyman, younger brother of Jean-Jacques Lefranc, Marquis de Pompignan.

Pompignan was the archbishop of Vienne against whose defense of the faith Voltaire launched the good-natured mockery of Les Lettres d'un Quaker. Elected to the Estates General, he passed over to the Liberal side, and led the 149 members of the clergy who united with the third estate to form the National Assembly. He was one of its first presidents, and was minister of public worship when the Civil Constitution of the Clergy was forced upon the clergy.

1715 births
1790 deaths
French untitled nobility
Bishops of Le Puy-en-Velay
Archbishops of Vienne